Cyamelide is an amorphous white solid with the approximate formula (HNCO)x.  It is the product of the  polymerisation of cyanic acid together with its cyclic trimer cyanuric acid. It is a porcelain-like white substance which is insoluble in water.

References  

Polyamides